Nina Berkhout (born 1975) is a Canadian poet and novelist who won the Archibald Lampman Award in 2013 for Elseworlds, a volume of poetry. The award was for the year's best poetry. She is the author of The Gallery of Lost Species, a novel. Berkhout's earlier work has been shortlisted for THIS magazine's Great Canadian Literary Hunt, The Archibald Lampman Award, and the John Hirsch Award.

Bibliography
The Gallery of Lost Species (2015)

References 

Canadian women poets
1975 births
Living people